Nazife Güran (5 September 1921 – 20 December 1993) was a Turkish composer born in Vienna of a diplomat father. She studied music as a child with her mother and completed primary education in Ankara and high school in Istanbul. She continued her music education at the Berlin Hochschule Music Academy, studying with Rudolph Schmidt for piano and Paul Hoffer for composition. After returning to Ankara, she studied with Ernst Praetorius.

In 1952, she married Dr. Ismail Yilmaz Güran, had a son the next year, and then continued her studies at the Cologne Music Academy. Returning to Turkey in 1969, she taught music at Cemberlitas Girls' High School and continued work as a composer.

Works
Nazife composed over a thousand works. Selected compositions include:

Merdiven	
Şehit Çocuğuna Ninni	
Gece Deniz		
Yarını Bekleyen Köy
Hayalimdeki Bahçe	
Titreşim
Nurdan Bir Hale (Light from a Halo)
İbadet Sevinci	
Mehlika Sultan	
Dantel	
Göldeki Akisler	
Boğaziçinde Gezi	
Feraceli Hanım Nr.3

Her music has been recorded and issued on media, including:
Nazife Güran - Nurdan Bir Hale (September 22, 2006) Kalan Ses, ASIN: B002ISM2XA

References

1921 births
1993 deaths
20th-century classical composers
Music educators
Women classical composers
Turkish composers
Women music educators
20th-century women composers
Turkish expatriates in Austria
Turkish expatriates in Germany